Raj Bhavan, Karnataka is the official residence of the governor of Karnataka located in Bengaluru city, in the State of Karnataka, India. Constructed in the late 18th century.

History
Formerly known as the Bengaluru Residency Mysuru state residency or, simply, residency. It is located in the capital city of Bangalore, Karnataka. During Mysore Kingdom, the building was home to the Resident of Commissioner that was in subsidiary alliance with the Kingdom of Mysore.

Situated at the highest point in Bangalore, High Grounds (3031 feet above sea level), it was built by Sir Mark Cubbon between 1840 and 1842 when he was the Commissioner of Mysore territories of the British. After Cubbon left in 1861, the bungalow was put up for sale and purchased by the succeeding commissioner, Lewin Bentham Bowring, using government funds, and became the official residence of the Commissioner.

A ballroom was constructed in 1874 when the King Edward VII, Prince of Wales, visited India. It was named 'Serapis Room' after the ship which brought the Prince to Mumbai. Many changes were made to the building during its existence in the British Raj.In 1881, when power over the territory was transferred back to the Mysore Royal family, the office of the Commissioner was abolished.

Post 1947
The building became the official residence of the Resident and came to be called the Residency till the Independence of India (15 August 1947) when the Residency was abolished. The Constitution of Independent India created the office of the "Raj Pramukh" (Governor). The Maharaja of Mysore was made the first Raj Pramukh of Mysore. Although the Residency was converted to the official residence of the Raj Pramukh, the Maharaja of Mysore chose not to stay there, preferring his own palaces at Bangalore and Mysore. Hence, the Residency was converted to a state guesthouse by the Government of India.  State guests such as the President of India, the Vice President of India, central government ministers and chief ministers of other states stayed at the Residency. The Chief Minister of Karnataka hosted parties at the Residency. On Independence Day and Republic Day, parties were hosted by the Raj Pramukh, a tradition that has continued till now.

The Residency was also used by the Congress party for its legislature party meetings.

During Franklin D. Roosevelt's visit to India, his wife Eleanor Roosevelt stayed at the Residency.

In 1964, the then Maharaja of Mysore, Jayachamaraja Wodeyar, became the Governor of Madras, and relinquished his gubernatorial post in Mysore. General S M Srinagesh succeeded him, and moved into the Raj Bhavan. It has been the residence of the Governor of the state since.

Originally a single storeyed building, the Raj Bhavan was expanded by the addition of a first floor in 1967, built carefully to adhere to the architectural style of the original structure.

The art collection comprises paintings of a variety of Indian schools of art, as well as some from the West.

The garden is fringed with century old pine and fir trees, and has an artificial waterfall.

See also
 Government Houses of the British Indian Empire

References

External links

The official web site of Governor of Karnataka
Photographic tour of Raj Bhavan, Karnataka

Governors' houses in India
Palaces in Bangalore
Government of Karnataka
Government buildings in Karnataka
Houses completed in 1842
1964 establishments in Mysore State